Events from the year 1115 in Ireland.

Incumbents
High King of Ireland: Domnall Ua Lochlainn

Events
An assault on Norse-Gaelic Dublin by Diarmait mac Énna meic Murchada and Conchobar Ua Conchobair Failge, joint Kings of Leinster, is thwarted by Domnall Gerrlámhach.

Deaths
Conchobar Ua Conchobair Failge, slain in Dublin.
Diarmait mac Énna meic Murchada, slain in Dublin.

References

Years of the 12th century in Ireland